Andrew Emanuel "Andy" Manatos (born 1944) is a Greek-American lobbyist and a former Assistant Secretary of Commerce in the administration of President Jimmy Carter.

Early life and education 
Manatos was born on July 7, 1944, in Washington, D.C., to Dorothy and Mike Manatos. His father, Mike, served as White House Assistant for Senate Liaison to Presidents Kennedy and Johnson. Andy completed undergraduate studies at American University, where he continued to earn a master's degree in political theory.

Career 
Manatos was the youngest Presidential advance man for President Lyndon B. Johnson. Manatos then served as a Committee Staff Director in the U.S. Senate and aide to Senators Thomas Eagleton and Gale McGee. In 1977, President Jimmy Carter nominated Manatos to be Assistant Secretary of Commerce. He was the youngest sub-cabinet official in the administration and led the effort that moved the Foreign Commercial Service from the State Department to the Commerce Department. 

In 1983, Manatos and his father, Mike, formed the public policy firm, Manatos & Manatos. Andy currently serves as CEO of the firm, which he operates with his eldest son, Mike A. Manatos. Clients of Manatos & Manatos have included Fortune 500 Companies, foreign countries, religious leaders, the United States Olympic Committee, and the Smithsonian Institution. He was chosen as one of Washington's most powerful private sector people by Regardies Magazine. 

Much of Manatos' pro bono work has benefited the Greek-American community in the United States. He created and has maintained for 33 years an annual meeting of that community with the President of the United States. He serves on the board of several Hellenic organizations. He was presented the highest recognition from the Archbishop of America, the St. Paul medal, and was also appointed to the Order of St. Andrew by the Ecumenical Patriarch, the spiritual leader of 300 million Orthodox Christians worldwide. 

He has been a guest op-ed writer for The Washington Post, The New York Times, The Chicago Tribune and other newspapers.

Manatos created and serves on the board of the Committee for Citizen Awareness (CCA), a not-for-profit organization that, for 23 years, has distributed over half-a-million award-winning, civic education videotapes to teachers and libraries across the United States. He also serves with former President Bill Clinton on the board of the THEA Foundation and hosts an annual dinner with the former President to raise money for the foundation's work.

Personal life 
Manatos and his wife, Tina, have four sons and eight grandchildren.

His family comes from the island of Crete, Greece.

References 

American lobbyists
American people of Greek descent
1947 births
Living people